Union Creek is a stream in the U.S. state of South Dakota.

Union Creek takes its name from Union County.

See also
List of rivers of South Dakota

References

Rivers of Union County, South Dakota
Rivers of South Dakota